Marie Semoes also spelt Marie Simoes is an Indian athlete. She won a bronze medal in high jump in 1951 Asian Games.

References

Athletes (track and field) at the 1951 Asian Games
Indian female high jumpers
Asian Games bronze medalists for India
Asian Games medalists in athletics (track and field)
Medalists at the 1951 Asian Games